Lilingayon is the largest of the 31 barangays of Valencia City, Bukidnon.
It is bounded by Mount Nebo, Guinoyuran, and Lourdes, in the east,
the municipality of Lantapan in the north, the municipalities of
Talakag and Pangantucan in the west, and
the municipality of Maramag in the south.

Among the tourist attractions of Lilingayon are its over a dozen waterfalls. Two of the better known ones are Kimatahay and Alamay, both along the Tandacol River.

References

Barangays of Valencia, Bukidnon